Denis Eduardovich Ayrapetyan (born 17 January 1997) is a Russian short track speed skater. He is a two-times European bronze medalist as part of the Russian relay team.

References

External links
 

1997 births
Living people
Russian male short track speed skaters
Sportspeople from Penza
Short track speed skaters at the 2012 Winter Youth Olympics
Short track speed skaters at the 2022 Winter Olympics
Olympic short track speed skaters of Russia
Russian people of Armenian descent